Miss Colombia 2005, the 71st Miss Colombia pageant, was held in Cartagena de Indias, Colombia, on November 14, 2005, after three weeks of events.  The winner of the pageant was Valerie Dominguez Tarud, Señorita Atlántico.

The pageant was broadcast live on RCN TV from the Centro de Convenciones Julio Cesar Turbay in Cartagena de Indias, Colombia. At the conclusion of the final night of competition, outgoing titleholder Adriana Tarud crowned Valerie Dominguez Tarud of Atlántico as the new Miss Colombia.

Results

Special awards
 Miss Photogenic (voted by press reporters) - Silvana Patricia Altahona López (Meta)
 Best Body Figura Bodytech - Valerie Dominguez Tarud  (Atlántico)
 Miss Congeniality - Liliana del Carmen Morales Barrios (Bolivar)
 Best Costume - Ana María Castañeda (Sucre)
 Reina de la Policia - Claudia Margarita González Dangond (Cesar)
 Señorita Puntualidad - Claudia Margarita González Dangond (Cesar)
 Miss Elegance - Karina Guerra Rodriguez (Chocó)

Delegates
The Miss Colombia 2005 delegates are:

Antioquia - Dayanna María Gonzalez Tamayo
Atlántico - Valerie Domínguez Tarud
Bolívar - María del Carmen Morales Barrios
Cartagena DT y C - María Catalina Garcia Ciodaro
Cauca - María Virginia Hormaza Garrido
Cesar - Claudia Margarita González Dangond
Chocó - Karina Guerra Rodríguez
Córdoba - Lissete Wadad Barakat Debiase
Cundinamarca - Astrid Helena Cristancho Palacio
Guajira - Hagna Milena Fernández Hernández
Huila - Lina María Polania Ibagon
Magdalena - Malka Iriña Piña Berdugo
Meta - Silvana Patricia Altaona López
Nariño - Monica Caterine Castro Rodríguez
Norte de Santander - Paola Andrea O'meara Lizcano
Quindío - Ana Carolina Quintero Jimenez
San Andrés and Providencia - Tatiana Peña Gutiérrez
Santander - Paola Andrea Ordoñez Vera
Sucre - Ana María Castañeda Gómez
Tolima - Yuliana Cardenas Mejía
Valle - María Alejandra Peña González

References and footnotes

External links
Official site

Miss Colombia
2005 in Colombia
2005 beauty pageants